Joe or Joseph Strong may refer to:
 Joseph Strong (baseball), Negro leagues pitcher
 Joe Strong, American Major League Baseball pitcher
 Joseph Strong (politician), politician in Newfoundland
 Joseph Dwight Strong, American artist and illustrator
 Joe Strong (footballer), Australian rules footballer